The 2015 Australian human powered vehicle season began on the 28 February with the first round of the Victorian HPV Series at Casey Fields and concludes with the RACV Energy Breakthrough series at Maryborough, Victoria.

Australia is the world leader in Human powered vehicle (Velomobile) racing.

Season calendar

Season review 
After dominating the first two races of the 2015 season Platt Racing amicably disbanded. Some riders are continuing on in other teams whilst others have retired.

References 

Human Powered Vehicle
Cycle racing in Australia
Hum